The 2002 WNBA Playoffs was the postseason for the Women's National Basketball Association's 2002 season which ended with the  Western Conference champion and defending WNBA champion Los Angeles Sparks beating the Eastern Conference champion New York Liberty, 2-0. Lisa Leslie was named the MVP of the Finals.

Format
The top 4 teams from each conference qualify for the playoffs.
All 4 teams are seeded by basis of their standings.

Road to the playoffs
Eastern Conference

Western Conference

Note:Teams with an "X" clinched playoff spots.

Playoffs

First round
- New York defeats Indiana, 2–1
Indiana 73, New York 55 (Aug. 16)
New York 84, Indiana 65 (Aug. 18)
New York 75, Indiana 60 (Aug. 20) 

- Washington defeats Charlotte, 2–0
Washington 74, Charlotte 62 (Aug. 15)
Washington 62, Charlotte 59 (Aug. 17)

- Los Angeles defeats Seattle, 2–0
Los Angeles 78, Seattle 61 (Aug. 15)
Los Angeles 69, Seattle 59 (Aug. 17)

- Utah defeats Houston, 2–1
Utah 66, Houston 59 (Aug. 16)
Houston 83, Utah 77 (2OT) (Aug. 18)
Utah 75, Houston 72 (Aug. 20)

Conference Finals
- New York defeats Washington, 2–1
Washington 79, New York 74 (Aug. 22)
New York 96, Washington 79 (Aug. 24)
New York 64, Washington 57 (Aug. 25)

- Los Angeles defeats Utah, 2–0
Los Angeles 75, Utah 67 (Aug. 22)
Los Angeles 103, Utah 77 (Aug. 24)

WNBA Finals

- Los Angeles defeats New York, 2–0
L.A. 71, New York 63 (Aug. 29)
L.A. 69, New York 66 (Aug. 31)

See also
List of WNBA Champions

References

External links
Link to WNBA Playoffs series, recap, and boxscores

Playoffs
Women's National Basketball Association Playoffs